Oconee County Regional Airport  is a county-owned municipal airport in Oconee County, South Carolina,  west of Clemson.  Clemson University's Flying Club and the Flying Tigers Skydiving Club are based at the airport.  The non-profit 401(c)(7) Golden Corner Flying Club LLC is based here. During football season, the airport sees a spike in activity, due to its proximity to the University and Memorial Stadium.

Facilities and aircraft
It has one asphalt paved runway designated 7/25 which measures 5,000 by 100 feet (1,524 x 30 m).

The airport has plans to extend west the existing runway to an ultimate length of 6,000 ft.  This would require the repositioning of Shiloh Road in Oconee County.

For the 12-month period ending July 29, 2009, the airport had 35,601 aircraft operations, an average of 98 per day: 95% general aviation, 4% air taxi and less than 1% military. At that time there were 49 aircraft based at this airport: 48 single-engine and 1 multi-engine.

References

External links
 Oconee County Regional Airport website
 Golden Corner Flying Club website
 

Airports in South Carolina
Buildings and structures in Oconee County, South Carolina
Transportation in Oconee County, South Carolina